Montiferru is a historical region of central-western Sardinia, Italy. It takes its name from the eponymous extinct volcano massif, whose main peak is the Monte Urtigu (1,050 m). Extending for some 700 km², the massif had originally a maximum elevation of c. 1,600/1,700 m, later reduced due to erosion.

The volcanic origin of the area is testified by the basaltic rocks of the seaside. Water sources are frequent, rivers from the area including the Rio Mannu.

The economy is essentially rural, based on agriculture and animal husbandry. Flora goes from the Mediterranean shrubland of the coast to olive and fruit trees in the mainland, up to pine and oaks in the more elevated parts. Wildlife include wild boar, fox, Sardinian hare, European hedgehog, least weasel, marten, the rare Sardinian wildcat, vulture, carrion crow, peregrine falcon, hoopoe, little owl, Eurasian scops owl and others.

Geology
The volcanic activity was at its most intense 3.6 million years ago. The volcano erupted a wide variety of lavas including basanite, hawaiite, phonolite, mugearite, benmoreite and trachyte, as well as small amounts of basaltic andesite and basaltic trachyandesite.

Communes
Bonarcado
Cuglieri
Narbolia
Paulilatino
Santu Lussurgiu
Scano di Montiferro
Seneghe
Sennariolo

Wildfire 2021

References

External links
Regional landscape overview  - Montiferru 

Geography of Sardinia
Mountains of Sardinia
Extinct volcanoes
Pliocene volcanoes
Volcanoes of Italy